Udo Riglewski and Michael Stich were the defending champions, but lost in the semifinals this year.

Patrick Galbraith and Todd Witsken won the title, defeating Anders Järryd and Danie Visser 7–5, 6–4 in the final.

Seeds

  Udo Riglewski /  Michael Stich (semifinals)
  Anders Järryd /  Danie Visser (final)
  Patrick Galbraith /  Todd Witsken (champions)
  Broderick Dyke /  Laurie Warder (semifinals)

Draw

Draw

External links
Draw

1991 BMW Open